Brookside is a village in the civil parish of Winkfield in the county of Berkshire, England.

References

Villages in Berkshire
Bracknell Forest